Konami GB Collection is a series of video game compilations composed of four volumes released in Japan for the Game Boy and re-released in Euro regions for the Game Boy Color. The compilations were originally released from 1997 to 1998 in Japan, and were later released in Europe in 2000.

Lineup

Despite sharing the same games, the Japan and European releases differ in their order of releases after Vol. 1.

Vol. 1
Japanese release: September 25, 1997

Euro release: February 2000

 Gradius (originally released as Nemesis)
 Dracula Densetsu / Castlevania: The Adventure
 Konami Racing (originally released as F1 Spirit)
 Contra / Probotector (released in North America as Operation C)
 (the European version still features human rather than robot characters, despite bearing the Probotector name)

Vol. 2
Japanese release: December 11, 1997 

Euro release: May 2000 (Vol. 3)

 Twinbee Da!! / Pop n' TwinBee
 Ganbare Goemon: Sarawareta Ebisumaru! / Mystical Ninja Starring Goemon
 Motocross Maniacs (called ‘Bikers’ on the Euro release)
 Guttang Gottong (originally released outside Japan as Loco-Motion)

Vol. 3
Japanese release: February 19, 1998

Euro release: July 2000 (Vol. 4) Gradius II: The Return of the Hero (originally released in Japan as Nemesis II, Nemesis II: The Return of the Hero in Europe, and Gradius: The Interstellar Assault in North America)
 Dracula Densetsu II / Castlevania II: Belmont's Revenge Yie Ar Kung-Fu Kekkyoku Nankyoku Daibōken / Antarctic AdventureVol. 4
Japanese release: March 19, 1998

Euro release: February 2000 (Vol. 2) Parodius Da! / Parodius Quarth / Block Game Konamic Sports / Track & Field (originally released in Japan as Konamic Sports in Barcelona)
 FroggerRegional differences
The original Japanese releases feature Super Game Boy palette and border support, with game descriptions and instructions provided by the girls from the original Tokimeki Memorial. The European versions added color support for the Game Boy Color, but removed the Super Game Boy palettes and borders; as well as the Tokimeki Memorial'' characters and tutorials.

1997 video games
Game Boy games
Game Boy-only games
Konami video game compilations
Video games developed in Japan